Cheongju City Football Club was a South Korean football club based in the city of Cheongju. The club, originally named Cheonan FC and based in the city of Cheonan, rebranded to Cheongju City FC in February 2016. In October 2018, the club merged with Cheongju FC.

Season-by-season records

Cheonan FC

Cheongju City FC

Honours

Domestic

League
 K3 League
 Runners-up (2): 2016, 2017

Cup
 Korean National Sports Festival
 Chungbuk Champions (2): 2016, 2018

External links
Official website 
Soccerway profile

K3 League (2007–2019) clubs
Cheongju
Sport in North Chungcheong Province
Association football clubs established in 2005
Association football clubs established in 2016
Association football clubs disestablished in 2018
2005 establishments in South Korea
2016 establishments in South Korea
2018 disestablishments in South Korea